The 1953 Milwaukee brewery strike was a labor strike that involved approximately 7,100 workers at six breweries in Milwaukee, Wisconsin, United States. The strike began on May 14 of that year after the Brewery Workers Local 9 and an employers' organization representing six Milwaukee-based brewing companies failed to agree to new labor contracts. These contracts would have increased the workers' wages and decreased their working hours, making them more comparable to the labor contracts of brewery workers elsewhere in the country. The strike ended in late July, after the Valentin Blatz Brewing Company (one of the smaller companies in the organization) broke with the other breweries and began negotiating with the union. The other companies soon followed suit and the strike officially ended on July 29, with union members voting to accept new contracts that addressed many of their initial concerns.

Background 

The city of Milwaukee has a long history pertaining to the brewing industry and has been the home for numerous major breweries. In the early 1950s, the Milwaukee-based Joseph Schlitz Brewing Company was the largest brewer in the world and in 1952 it set a world record by churning out 6.35 million barrels of beer in one year. Several years prior, in 1946, the Brewery Workers (the national labor union representing brewery workers) became affiliated with the Congress of Industrial Organizations (CIO). The Local union representing workers in Milwaukee, Local 9, traced its history back to the late 1800s and was one of the most powerful unions in Wisconsin. On May 1, 1953, the labor contract between Local 9 members and Milwaukee brewers (represented by a joint bargaining committee) was set to expire. Subsequently, Local 9 representatives submitted a new proposed contract, with items in the proposal included a $0.25 per hour wage increase, a reduction in working hours from 40 to 35 per week, additional holidays, and improvements to pension and health plans. These provisions were designed to put Milwaukee brewery workers on equal pay and hours as workers on the West Coast and East Coast of the United States. Additionally, the union wanted to raise the weekly salary for workers in the bottling and brewing departments from $80 and $82, respectively, to $90.75. At the time, the base hourly pay for Milwaukee brewery workers was $2. John Schmitt, the local's recording secretary, stated that the reduced number of hours was due to increased productivity from advancements in machinery, with a Chicago Daily Tribune article at the time reporting him as saying "there are not 12 months of work for our people any more." Finally, on May 14, 1953, after months of discussions that resulted in no agreement between the union and companies, approximately 7,100 members of Local 9 from 6 breweries performed a walkout, beginning a labor strike against the breweries. According to a later report by the Milwaukee Journal Sentinel, the union members had "voted overwhelmingly" to strike.

The strike affected six brewing companies in Milwaukee: Schlitz, A. Gettelman Brewing Company, Independent Milwaukee Brewery, Miller Brewing Company, Pabst Brewing Company, and the Valentin Blatz Brewing Company.

Course of the strike 
While the strike shut down brewing throughout the city, many bars and other drinking establishments in Milwaukee had a stockpile of beer, avoiding a potential shortage early on. On June 1, despite making no concessions to Milwaukee employees regarding working hours, Schlitz offered workers at a brewery in Brooklyn a reduction in weekly hours from 37.5 to 35 and a pay increase of $0.66 per hour more than the base pay rate in Milwaukee. This action increased solidarity among the Milwaukee strikers. As the strike continued into June, drinking establishments in Milwaukee began importing beer from different breweries brewed in places outside of Milwaukee, such as Peru, Indiana. On June 26, Local 9 members voted 6,274 to 348 to reject a $0.15 hourly wage increase that had been offered by the breweries. At the time, the brewing companies were beginning to hurt financially due to the strike. While Pabst and Schlitz had breweries in other locations, the other companies only operated breweries in Milwaukee, causing them to be more greatly affected by the strike.

In late July, Blatz, whose only breweries were in Milwaukee, broke with the other brewing companies and began to negotiate directly with Local 9 regarding a contract. Following this, the other companies followed suit and began to negotiate. With Blatz having already secured an agreement with the union, the other companies were forced to accept the terms of the Blatz agreement, which included an hourly wage increase, two additional holidays, improvements to the life insurance and pension plans, and a 30 minute paid lunch, among other things. In total, the strike lasted 76 days, ending on July 29. On that day, union members voted approximately 3 to 1 to accept new labor contracts with the 6 brewing companies.

Aftermath 
Following the strike, Blatz was removed from the association representing the Milwaukee brewers for their "unethical" actions during the strike. At the 1953 Schlitz company Christmas party, Schlitz president Erwin C. Uihlein said the following regarding the strike:

The strike contributed to Schlitz's rival Anheuser-Busch (based in St. Louis) overtaking them in 1953 as the country's largest brewing company. Both Anheuser-Busch and Schlitz competed for the top spot throughout the 1950s, and Schlitz had held it in the two years prior to the strike. However, in the years following the strike, Schlitz would rebound and continue to grow, acquiring numerous smaller brewing companies during the 1960s. They again held the top spot between 1955 and 1956.

See also 

 1981 Schlitz strike

Notes

References

Bibliography 

 
 
 
 
 
 
 
 
 
 

1953 in Wisconsin
1953 labor disputes and strikes
Alcohol in the United States
Beer in Wisconsin
Brewery workers
Congress of Industrial Organizations
1950s in Milwaukee
Labor disputes in Wisconsin
Molson Coors Beverage Company
Pabst Brewing Company